Lewis Dare Holden is a New Zealand public servant and economist.  He is currently the Deputy Commissioner for Auckland at the State Services Commission.  Prior to this appointment he was the Chief Executive of the Ministry for Culture and Heritage. Holden was previously deputy secretary of the economic strategy branch at the Ministry of Economic Development.

Lewis Dare Holden is not the Lewis Joseph Holden who is the campaign chair for New Zealand Republic. They are not related.

Education
Holden has a BA (Honours) from Victoria University of Wellington, a Diploma in Journalism from the University of Canterbury and a Masters of Public and Private Management from Yale School of Management. While at Victoria, Holden was elected to the executive of Victoria University of Wellington Students' Association.

Career
Holden was appointed Deputy Commissioner in March 2015 after being the Chief Executive of the Ministry for Culture and Heritage since June 2009.  Prior to joining the Ministry for Culture and Heritage, Holden was Deputy Secretary of the Ministry of Economic Development.   Before that, Holden worked for the New Zealand Treasury, and worked in the Department of the Prime Minister and Cabinet as an economic advisor for Jim Bolger. Holden also spent a term as Alternative Executive Director at the World Bank in Washington DC.

Holden was instrumental in developing the previous Labour governments' "regional development" and "economic transformation" policy agenda (such as the development of the New Zealand film industry), and  undertook a stock take of government programs and their impact on New Zealand business. Holden held the position as Deputy Secretary of the MED from November 2001. In October 2006, he became Deputy Secretary of the new Economic Strategy branch.

Holden also worked as a researcher for the 1986 Royal Commission on the Electoral System, which initiated electoral reform in New Zealand.

References

External links
 Ministry for Culture and Heritage leadership team: Lewis Holden

Living people
Year of birth missing (living people)
New Zealand economists
New Zealand public servants
University of Canterbury alumni
Victoria University of Wellington alumni
Yale School of Management alumni
New Zealand journalists